Enson (stylized as ENSON) is an album by Japanese J-pop and anison artist Masaaki Endoh of JAM Project. In this album, and its follow up Enson2 (stylized as ENSON2), Endoh covers theme songs from multiple anime, tokusatsu, and video games. During its 3 weeks on the Oricon Weekly Album Charts, the first album peaked at #43, selling 6,383 copies. The second album remained on the charts for 6 weeks and peaked at #50.

ENSON track list

 from Genesis of Aquarion
"Butter-Fly" (originally by Kōji Wada) from Digimon Adventure
 from Mobile Suit Gundam: The 08th MS Team
 from Muv-Luv
 from Utawarerumono: Chiriyuku Mono e no Komoriuta
"Ai o Torimodose!!" (originally by Crystal King) from Fist of the North Star
"Go Go Power Rangers" (originally by The Mighty RAW) from Mighty Morphin Power Rangers
 from My-HiME
 from Stellvia of the Universe
"In the Chaos" (originally by JAM Project featuring Masami Okui) from Galaxy Angel A
 from Princess Mononoke
"Wing of Destiny" (originally by Maho Tomita) from Galaxy Angel II Zettai Ryōiki no Tobira
 from Hamos The Green Chariot

ENSON2 track list

"Eternal Blaze" (originally by Nana Mizuki) from Magical Girl Lyrical Nanoha A's
 from Bokurano: Ours
 from Gurren Lagann
 from Magic Knight Rayearth
 from Air
 from Kinnikuman
"Go Tight!" (originally by Akino) from Genesis of Aquarion
 from Hajime Ningen Gyatols
"God Knows..." (originally by Aya Hirano) from The Melancholy of Haruhi Suzumiya
 from Ultra Seven
 from Hidamari Sketch
 from The Galaxy Express 999
"Good-bye to Yesterday" (self-cover) from Cybuster

ENSON3 track list

"Kimi no Shiranai Monogatari" (originally by Supercell) from Bakemonogatari
"Kasabuta" (originally by Chiwata Hidenori) from Konjiki no Gash Bell
"Ojamajo Carnival" (originally by Maho-Do) from Ojamajo Doremi
"Eiyuu" (originally by doa) from Ultraman Nexus
"Snow Halation" (originally by μ's) from Love Live! School Idol Project
"Dream Solister" (originally by True) from Sound! Euphonium
"Pegasus Fantasy" (originally by Make-Up) from Saint Seiya
"Bokutachi no Yukue" (originally by Hitomi Takahashi) from Gundam SEED Destiny
"My Soul, Your Beats" (originally by Lia) from Angel Beats
"Kimi ga Suki da to Sakebitai" (originally by Baad) from Slam Dunk
"Good bye, Good Luck" (originally by Totalfat) from Naruto: Shōnen Hen
"Orion wo Nazoru" (originally by Unison Square Garden) from Tiger & Bunny
"Mata Ashita" (self-cover) from Honki Sentai Gachiranger

References

External links
The Enson series at Lantis.jp
Enson at Lantis.jp
Enson2 at Lantis.jp

2008 albums